Arch Street Bridge is Parker truss bridge over the Passaic River in Paterson, New Jersey. It was built in 1907 and rehabilitated in 1997. It was the third structure built at the location within a few years, the other having been destroyed by floods in 1902 and 1903.
The bridge was once a crossing for the Public Service trolley lines.

A historic bridge survey conducted by the New Jersey Department of Transportation (NJDOT) from 1991–1994 determined that the bridge was eligible for listing on the New Jersey Register of Historic Places and the National Register of Historic Places. In June 1995, the State Historic Preservation Office concurred. It was listed on the state register January 30, 2018 and the federal register on March 22, 2018.

See also
 Straight Street Bridge
 West Broadway Bridge
 Sixth Avenue Bridge
 List of crossings of the Upper Passaic River
 List of crossings of the Lower Passaic River
 List of crossings of the Hackensack River
 Passaic River Flood Tunnel

References 

Bridges over the Passaic River
Bridges completed in 1898
Road bridges on the National Register of Historic Places in New Jersey
Transportation in Paterson, New Jersey
Buildings and structures in Paterson, New Jersey
Bridges in Passaic County, New Jersey
Oswego Bridge Company
Steel bridges in the United States
Pratt truss bridges in the United States
National Register of Historic Places in Passaic County, New Jersey
1898 establishments in New Jersey